Colonel Mortimer L. Delano was head of the Aero-Military War College of America and the First Aviation Corps and The Aero Military Service Federation of America. Around 1914, he was issuing pilots licenses and selling pilots uniforms and selling military titles.

Organizations
Aero-Military War College of America 
First Aviation Corps or First Provisional Aviation Corps 
The Aero Military Service Federation of America

References

Year of birth missing
Year of death missing
Aviation pioneers
Aviation history of the United States